"Golden Boy" is a song performed by Israeli singer Nadav Guedj and was written by Doron Medalie. It was chosen by public broadcaster IBA to represent Israel in the Eurovision Song Contest 2015. The song was premièred on 12 March 2015. It was released as a digital download on 15 March 2015 as the lead single from his debut studio album Nadav Guedj (2016). It is the first ever Israeli Eurovision entry with lyrics entirely in the English language. Within the Eurovision Song Contest, the song went through to the grand final after finishing in 3rd place in the 2nd Semi-final. The song finished in 9th place in the grand final with 97 points.

Track listing

Music video
According to Eurovision Song Contest YouTube Channel, Nadav Guedj's Golden Boy live performance at 2nd Semi-final was the fifth most watched video by subscribers on the channel (before Eurovision Song Contest 2016 begin), and the fourth most 2015 watched video, just behind Måns Zelmerlöw, Polina Gagarina and Loic Nottet live performances videos.

Eleni Foureira version
On 29 June 2015, Greek singer Eleni Foureira released a Greek version of the song titled "Sto theo me paei" ("Take Me to God"). It was performed at the 2015 MAD Video Music Awards.

Chart performance

Weekly charts

Release history

References

Eurovision songs of Israel
Eurovision songs of 2015
2015 songs
2015 debut singles
Universal Music Group singles
Songs written by Doron Medalie
Number-one singles in Israel